Tomasz Tomaszewski, PM is a Polish violinist and the first concertmaster in Deutsche Oper Berlin. Born in Czechowice, Poland. He studied at the Warsaw Academy of Music, then the Leningrad Conservatory and later in Freiburg, he also attended master classes with Fyodor Druzhinin, Oleh Krysa, Pierre Fournier, Liebermann, Hiller and Szerny. He is a professor on Berlin University of the Arts. He plays in Kwartet Polski quartet ensemble. He performed on festivals like Silesian Festival of Ludwig van Beethoven and New Year NFM Festival. He also played on Kraków Poetry Salon.

References

External links
 

Polish violinists
Male violinists
Year of birth missing (living people)
Living people
21st-century violinists
21st-century male musicians